John Hamlin Folger (December 18, 1880 – July 19, 1963) was a Democratic U.S. Congressman from North Carolina between 1941 and 1949.

Born in Rockford, North Carolina, Folger attended public schools in Surry County. He graduated from Guilford College in Greensboro, North Carolina and studied law at the University of North Carolina at Chapel Hill.

Admitted to the bar in 1901, Folger opened a law practice in Dobson, North Carolina. He was elected mayor of the town of Mount Airy, North Carolina from 1908, serving until 1912.  He was sent to the North Carolina House of Representatives from 1927 to 1928 and to the North Carolina State Senate from 1931 to 1932.

Active in the North Carolina Democratic Party, Folger was a delegate to state Democratic conventions between 1924 and 1940 and to the Democratic National Conventions in 1932 and 1944. After the death of his brother, Rep. Alonzo D. Folger, John Folger was sent to Congress in a special election called to fill the vacancy. He was re-elected three more times, serving in the 77th, 78th, 79th, and 80th United States Congresses.

Folger did not stand for reelection in 1948 and returned to his law practice in Mount Airy, North Carolina, from which he retired in 1959. He died in Clemmons, North Carolina in 1963 and is buried in Mount Airy's Oakdale Cemetery.

External links

1880 births
1963 deaths
Guilford College alumni
People from Surry County, North Carolina
University of North Carolina School of Law alumni
Democratic Party members of the North Carolina House of Representatives
Democratic Party North Carolina state senators
North Carolina lawyers
Democratic Party members of the United States House of Representatives from North Carolina
20th-century American politicians
20th-century American lawyers